Ezequiel Santos da Silva (born 9 March 1998), simply known as Ezequiel, is a Brazilian footballer who plays as a winger for Sanfrecce Hiroshima.

Career
On 14 January 2019, Sport Recife announced that they had loaned Ezequiel and his teammate Leandro from Botafogo for the 2019 season.

Career statistics

Club

References

External links

Sport Recife profile 

1998 births
Living people
Footballers from Rio de Janeiro (city)
Brazilian footballers
Brazilian expatriate footballers
Association football forwards
Campeonato Brasileiro Série A players
Campeonato Brasileiro Série B players
J1 League players
Botafogo de Futebol e Regatas players
Sport Club do Recife players
Cruzeiro Esporte Clube players
Sanfrecce Hiroshima players
Brazilian expatriate sportspeople in Japan
Expatriate footballers in Japan